Jennifer Pan (born June 17, 1986) is a Vietnamese Canadian woman who was convicted of a 2010 kill-for-hire attack targeting both of her parents, murdering her mother and injuring her father. The crime took place at the Pan residence in Unionville, Markham, Ontario, in the Greater Toronto Area. Pan was found guilty on multiple charges and sentenced to life imprisonment with the possibility of parole after 25 years, the same penalty as her co-conspirators.

Early life and education 
Jennifer Pan's mother, Bich Ha Pan (pronounced "Bick"), and father, Huei Hann Pan, were immigrants from the Chinese diaspora in Vietnam (Viet Hoa) to Canada. Hann was born and educated in Vietnam, moving to Canada in 1979 as a political refugee. Bich also immigrated as a refugee. The couple were married in Toronto and lived in Scarborough. Their two children are Jennifer, born 1986, and Felix, born 1989. The Pans found work at Magna International, an auto parts manufacturer in Aurora, Ontario. Hann worked as a tool and die maker, while Bich made car parts. Hann and Bich were thrifty and by 2004 were financially stable enough to purchase a "large" house with a two-car garage on a residential street in Markham, a city in the Greater Toronto Area with a large Asian population. Bich drove a Lexus ES 300 and Hann drove a Mercedes-Benz C-Class (W203). They had accumulated $200,000 in savings.

Jennifer's parents set many goals for their children and had extremely high expectations of them. Jennifer was made to take piano lessons at the age of four, as well as figure skating classes where she trained most days during the week. She had hopes of becoming an Olympic figure skating champion until she tore a ligament in her knee. Jennifer attended Mary Ward Catholic Secondary School where she played the flute in the school band. According to her high school friend Karen K. Ho, Hann was seen as "the classic tiger dad," and Bich was "his reluctant accomplice." The Pans picked Jennifer up when classes ended each day and monitored her extracurricular activities very closely. They never permitted her to date boys while attending high school, or to attend high school dances out of fear that these activities would distract her from her academic commitments. Jennifer was not permitted to attend any parties during the time her parents believed she was attending university. At the age of 22, "she had never gone to a club, been drunk, visited a friend's cottage or gone on vacation without her family." Jennifer and her friends reportedly regarded this upbringing as restrictive and greatly oppressive.

Despite her parents' high expectations that Jennifer receive good grades in lower school, her grades throughout high school were somewhat average (in the 70% range) except for music. She forged report cards multiple times using false templates, deceiving her parents into thinking she earned straight As. When Jennifer failed calculus class in grade 12, Ryerson University rescinded her early admission. As she could not bear to be perceived as a failure, she began to lie to those she knew, including her parents, and pretended she was attending university. Instead, she sat in cafés, taught as a piano instructor and worked in a restaurant to earn money. In order to maintain the charade, Jennifer told her parents she had won scholarships, later falsely claiming that she had accepted an offer into the pharmacology program at the University of Toronto. She went to the extent of purchasing second-hand textbooks and watching videos related to pharmacology in order to create notebooks full of purported class notes that she could show her parents.

Jennifer also requested permission from her parents to stay near the campus with a friend throughout the week. She was actually staying with her boyfriend, Daniel Chi-Kwong Wong, whom she had met in high school. He was of mixed Chinese and Filipino ancestry, resided in Ajax, and worked at a Boston Pizza restaurant. Wong, once a student at Mary Ward, transferred to Cardinal Carter Academy in North York, Toronto, due to low grades, and later studied at York University. He was an active marijuana dealer.

Adult life 
While pretending to complete her degree at the University of Toronto, Pan told her parents that she had started working as a volunteer at The Hospital for Sick Children. Hann and Bich soon became suspicious when they realized she did not have a hospital ID badge or uniform. On one occasion, Bich followed her daughter to "work" and quickly discovered her deception. Livid, Hann wanted to throw Jennifer out of the house, but her mother persuaded him to allow her to stay. As she had not completed high school due to failing calculus, she eventually began working to finish high school completely and was later encouraged by her parents to apply to university. She was, however, forbidden to contact Wong or to go anywhere except for her piano-teaching job. Nevertheless, she and Wong spoke secretly during this period.

By the time Jennifer was 24, Wong had grown weary of trying to pursue a relationship with her, as Jennifer was so daunted and restricted by her parents that she lived at home and only met him in secret. Wong broke off his relationship with Jennifer and began to date another young woman. After learning of the new relationships, Pan claimed to Wong that a man had entered her house, showing what appeared to be a police badge, after which several men had rushed in and gang-raped her. She claimed that after this, a bullet was mailed to her, and that both of these events were orchestrated by Wong's new girlfriend.

Murder 
In spring 2010, Pan was in contact with Andrew Montemayor, a high school friend who, she claims, had boasted in their high school years about robbing people at knife point, an assertion denied by Montemayor. Montemayor introduced her to Ricardo Duncan, a "goth kid" whom Pan claims she gave $1,500 to kill her father in the parking lot at his workplace. Duncan alleged that she once gave him $200 for a night out, but that he returned it, and that he rebuffed her when she asked him to kill her parents.

Pan and Wong were back in contact at this time and, according to the police, came up with a plan to hire a professional hitman for $10,000 to kill her parents, calculating that she would then inherit $500,000. They planned to move in together. Wong connected Pan with a man, Lenford Roy Crawford, Jamaican-born, whom he called Homeboy, and gave her a SIM card and an iPhone so that she could contact Crawford without using her usual cell phone. Crawford contacted another man, named Eric Shawn "Sniper" Carty, who in turn contacted Montreal-born David Mylvaganam. Crawford lived in Brampton and Mylvaganam lived in Toronto, while Carty, who previously lived in Rexdale, Toronto, at the time did not have a fixed residence. The Crown (prosecution) stated that Mylvaganam was one of the hitmen. Carty was later convicted for an unrelated 2009 murder.

The murder took place at the Pan house in Unionville neighbourhood in Markham, Ontario. On November 8, 2010, Pan unlocked the front door of the family home when she went to bed, then spoke by phone to Mylvaganam. Shortly afterwards, Mylvaganam and two other people entered the home through the unlocked front door, all carrying guns. In the court testimony, the Crown did not establish the identity of the other two hitmen; Wong and Crawford were at work. Carty stated that he was the driver for those who broke into the house, and that he selected them and was involved in plotting the attack. He did not state that he was one of the three or that he directly attacked others. The identity of the triggerperson remains unknown.

After demanding all the money in the house and ransacking the main bedroom, the three men took Bich and Hann to the basement where they shot them multiple times. Bich was killed but Hann survived his wounds. The three men then took all the cash that was in the house including $2,000 from Pan and left. Pan claimed that they tied her up, but that she managed to free her hands and dial 9-1-1. Hann Pan was treated at Markham Stouffville Hospital, before being moved to a trauma unit at Sunnybrook Hospital in Toronto, by aircraft.

Investigation and arrests 
The evening after the murder, Pan underwent her first interview with the police. Pan was arrested on November 22, 2010, during her third interview at the Markham police station (5 District) of York Regional Police. During that interview Pan admitted that she had hired the killers, but claimed that she hired them to kill her and not her parents. The interrogating police officer, William "Bill" Goetz, falsely told Pan that he had computer software that could analyze untruths in statements and that there were satellites that used infrared technology to analyze movements in buildings; in Canada, police are legally allowed to lie to those they are interrogating in regard to the evidence in the trial, as well as in regard to the strategies they are using. Goetz had used the Reid technique to obtain Pan's confession.

Mylvaganam was arrested at the Jane Finch Mall in North York, Toronto, on April 14, 2011.  Carty was arrested at the prison he was held in, Maplehurst Correctional Complex in Milton, Ontario, on April 15, 2011. Wong was arrested on April 26, 2011, at his place of employment. Crawford was the final suspect arrested, entering custody on May 4, 2011, in Brampton. Pan was held at Central East Correctional Centre in Lindsay, Ontario as a pre-trial inmate.

Trial 
The trial of Pan and her accomplices began on March 19, 2014, in Newmarket and continued for ten months. All pleaded not guilty to the charges of first degree murder, attempted murder, and conspiracy to commit murder. At the trial, York Regional Police evidence included exhaustive tracking of the mobile device movements and text message traffic, including over 100 messages sent between Pan and Wong in the six hours prior to the killing. Further evidence centered around the atypical nature of the "break-in", "robbery", shootings, and irregularities in Pan's testimony. Pan's obsession with Wong, her lack of true emotion and a confession regarding the attack, and recognition of the trauma she underwent were also detailed. A major irregularity was that Pan was not assaulted, blindfolded, taken to the basement, nor shot, leaving behind an eyewitness to the attack. Evidence from Hann, which differed greatly from Pan's version, also undermined her credibility. The trial included over 200 exhibits; over 50 witnesses testified at the trial.

Pan, Wong, Mylvaganam, and Crawford were all convicted on December 13, 2014, and each received a life sentence with no chance of parole for 25 years.

Originally, Carty was tried with the other perpetrators. Edward Sapiano, Carty's lawyer, fell ill, so around the summer of 2014, his case was declared a mistrial. In December 2015, Carty received an 18-year sentence after pleading guilty to conspiring to commit murder, with eligibility for parole after nine years. According to Carty, he did not wish to subject Hann Pan to another criminal trial.

Penalties and imprisonment 
Jennifer Pan was sentenced to life with no chance of parole for 25 years for the murder of her mother, and attempted murder of her father. Pan's father and brother requested a court order that banned her from ever contacting members of her surviving family again. Despite the objections of the defence lawyers, the judge filed the order. Pan is also banned from ever contacting Wong again.

, Pan is currently incarcerated at the Grand Valley Institution for Women in Kitchener, Ontario. Wong, previously held in Lindsay, Ontario, was at Collins Bay Institution in Kingston, Ontario. Mylvaganam was at Atlantic Institution in Renous, New Brunswick. Crawford was at Kent Institution in Agassiz, British Columbia. Carty, who requested to go to a federal prison in Western Canada or Atlantic Canada, was still at the provincial Millhaven Assessment Unit, awaiting his transfer to a federal prison. He later moved to Kent, where he died in his cell on April 26, 2018.

Media reaction 
According to the South China Morning Post, the case "sent shockwaves across Canada and the Asian diaspora." An editorial in the Northwest Asian Weekly suggested consideration of the "idea of recognizing the mental and psychological symptoms that parenting may have gone too far" in the Pan household. A story by Karen K. Ho in Toronto Life magazine brought the story to widespread attention by framing it an instance of tiger parenting gone tragically wrong. In 2016, journalist Jeremy Grimaldi published a true crime book about Pan called A Daughter's Deadly Deception: The Jennifer Pan Story. The Casefile, My Favorite Murder and Crimes of Passion podcasts and the Deadly Women series also covered the case.

Aftermath 
Bich-Ha Pan's funeral was held on November 15, 2010, and took place at the Ogden Chapel in Scarborough. A funeral for Bich Ha's father was held, according to Pan, prior to Bich Ha's to satisfy a Vietnamese custom that asks for older members of the family to have their funerals first. Jennifer Pan had organized both funerals and had been asked to do so. Bich-Ha was buried on November 19. Hann Pan could not attend due to his injuries.

See also 
 Bart Whitaker – An American man who ordered a hit on his family after he faked continuing attending a university
 Jean-Claude Romand – A French impostor who pretended to be a medical doctor for 18 years before killing his family when he was about to be exposed
 Sef Gonzales – A similar case involving a Filipino-Australian young adult who killed his parents and made it look like a hate crime.
 Suzane von Richthofen – A Brazilian woman who planned the killing of her parents
 Chinese Canadians in the Greater Toronto Area
 Vietnamese Canadians in the Greater Toronto Area

Notes

References 

Other sources
 Grimaldi, Jeremy. A Daughter's Deadly Deception: The Jennifer Pan Story. Dundurn Books, November 12, 2016.
 , 9781459735262.
 , 9781459735255.

External links 
 Index of articles – Yorkregion.com
 Casefile True Crime Podcast – Case 50: Jennifer Pan – April 15, 2017

1986 births
Living people
2010 murders in Canada
21st-century Canadian criminals
Canadian female criminals
Canadian female murderers
Canadian murderers
Canadian people of Chinese descent
Canadian people of Vietnamese descent
Canadian people convicted of murder
Canadian prisoners and detainees
Canadian prisoners sentenced to life imprisonment
Crime in Ontario
Matricides
Murder in Canada
Murder in Ontario
People convicted of murder by Canada
People from Markham, Ontario
People from Toronto
Prisoners and detainees of Canada
Prisoners sentenced to life imprisonment by Canada